Bruce Travis McGill (born July 11, 1950) is an American actor. He worked with director Michael Mann in the films The Insider (1999), Ali (2001), and Collateral (2004). McGill's other notable film roles include Daniel Simpson "D-Day" Day in John Landis's Animal House, Sheriff Dean Farley in My Cousin Vinny,  Matuzak in Timecop, Reverend Larson in Shallow Hal, Gene Revell in The Sum of All Fears, Edwin Stanton in Steven Spielberg’s Lincoln, and Lt. Brooks in Ride Along and its sequel Ride Along 2.

Bruce McGill's television roles include Jack Dalton on MacGyver (1985–1992) and Det. Vince Korsak on Rizzoli & Isles (2010–2016). He also portrayed an older Captain Braxton in one episode of Star Trek: Voyager (1999) and voiced Lloyd Waterman, the owner of Waterman Cable, on The Cleveland Show (2009-2013). He played Ralph Houk in Billy Crystal's made-for-television film 61* (2001). In 2021, he had a recurring role in the NASCAR comedy series The Crew on Netflix.

Early life
McGill was born in San Antonio, Texas, the son of Adriel "Squeaky" Rose (née Jacobs), the late Jewish San Antonio artist, and Woodrow Wilson McGill, a real estate and insurance agent. He graduated from Douglas MacArthur High School in the northeastern part of San Antonio and from The University of Texas at Austin with a degree in drama. He is related to former Texas State Senator A.R. Schwartz.

Career

Film work
McGill has starred in many films, perhaps his most well-known role being "D-Day" in the 1978 comedy classic National Lampoon's Animal House, a role McGill was desperate to take at the time, recalling his days as a young unemployed actor sitting in a New York City casting office. In Animal House, he played the William Tell Overture by drumming his fingers on his windpipe. He duplicated this talent in MacGyver, playing "Rock-The-Cradle" to lull a child in his care to sleep.

Some of his films include Into the Night, Wildcats, The Last Boy Scout, My Cousin Vinny, Cliffhanger, Timecop, Black Sheep, Courage Under Fire, Rosewood, Three Fugitives, Club Paradise, The Legend of Bagger Vance, The Sum of All Fears, Legally Blonde 2: Red, White & Blonde, Matchstick Men, Runaway Jury, Cinderella Man, Outlaw Trail: The Treasure of Butch Cassidy, and Vantage Point.

McGill is a favorite of director Michael Mann, having worked with him on three of his films: 1999's The Insider, 2001's Ali and 2004's Collateral. He has also appeared in four HBO TV films, first playing Yankees manager Ralph Houk in Billy Crystal's film 61* in 2001, then diplomat George Ball in the 2002 film Path to War; journalist Peter Arnett in Live from Baghdad later that year; and most recently Mac Stipanovich in the 2008 film Recount about the 2000 Presidential election in Florida. He portrayed CIA Director George Tenet in Oliver Stone's film W. and, most recently, Secretary of War Edwin M. Stanton in Steven Spielberg's Lincoln.

Television roles

McGill reprised his role as D-Day from National Lampoon's Animal House in the short-lived 1979 ABC TV Spinoff Delta House. His other television guest appearances range from Quantum Leap (in both the pilot and final episodes), Walker, Texas Ranger, CSI: Crime Scene Investigation, Crime Story, and Miami Vice (again, a Michael Mann production), to Star Trek: Voyager as Captain Braxton in the episodes "Future's End" and "Relativity".  He also appeared multiple times as a regular guest star in MacGyver as the title character's comical best friend, soldier of fortune/bush pilot Jack Dalton. Echoing that role, McGill often plays friends of the lead character in film and television. In 1994 he made a guest appearance along with Jay Leno in the Emmy nominated TV series, Home Improvement. 
He played Willard Cates in the short-lived series Wolf Lake. He was scheduled to join the cast of Bionic Woman in the fall of 2007. He also voiced Agent Buford in the video game Mercenaries. In 2009, McGill appeared on Law & Order: Special Victims Unit as Gordon Garrison, a zealously bigoted anti-immigration talk-show host who, after sparking a mini-riot in court, sets up the acquittal of the killer.  McGill also appeared on ABC's 2010 TV show, No Ordinary Family.

McGill also played Major Ed Ryan in the third season Babylon 5 episode "Severed Dreams" (which won the 1997 Hugo Award for Best Dramatic Presentation). Babylon 5 producer J. Michael Straczynski originally intended for Everett McGill to play the role. However he did not know McGill's first name, so when he asked to have McGill contacted, Straczynski was asked if he meant Bruce McGill, to which he replied yes. Even though it became apparent to Straczynski when Bruce McGill met him to discuss the role that he was not the McGill Straczynski had in mind, Straczynski decided to use him instead.

McGill also had a small role in a season 3 episode of Numb3rs as well as a season 3 episode of Psych.

McGill portrayed the character of veteran Boston Police Homicide Detective Vince Korsak on the TNT television crime drama, Rizzoli & Isles. The character of Korsak is the mentor and friend of Detective Jane Rizzoli, portrayed by Angie Harmon. Korsak saved Rizzoli's life from serial killer, Charles Hoyt. Korsak shot Hoyt's partner just before Hoyt was about to kill Rizzoli with a knife. In the episode "She Works Hard for the Money" (season 1 episode 4) Korsak is asked where he went to college. He responds "Didn't. Watched Animal House a few times."

McGill also had a recurring voice role on The Cleveland Show as Lloyd Waterman, the homosexual owner of Waterman Cable, where Cleveland Brown is employed as a cable installer.

In the 2016 US presidential election, McGill narrated several commercials for Donald Trump during his campaign It was reported in February 2017 that he would guest star as a decorated Vietnam War veteran in the television series NCIS.

McGill narrated the 2018 season of the Fox News documentary series Scandalous.

Filmography

Film

Television

Awards and nominations

References

External links

 
 
 
 Bruce McGill at MacGyver Online

1950 births
Male actors from San Antonio
American male film actors
American male television actors
American male voice actors
Living people
Douglas MacArthur High School (San Antonio) alumni
University of Texas at Austin College of Fine Arts alumni
20th-century American male actors
21st-century American male actors